Pride 33: The Second Coming was a mixed martial arts event held by Pride Fighting Championships on February 24, 2007 at the Thomas & Mack Center in Las Vegas, Nevada.

Background
In the night's main event, the welterweight champion Dan Henderson knocked out Pride Middleweight Champion Wanderlei Silva to become the new middleweight champion. This victory by Henderson avenged an earlier loss to Silva after their first encounter in 2000 at Pride 12 - Cold Fury, with Silva winning that fight in a three-round unanimous decision.

A fight between Sergei Kharitonov and Gilbert Yvel was submitted for approval by the Nevada State Athletic Commission (NSAC).  However, the fight did not take place after Yvel was denied a fighter's license by the NSAC based on a history of disqualification from multiple fights, most notably, his infamous attack on a referee. Kharitonov instead fought Mike Russow defeating him with an armbar.

A fight between Wes Sims and Kazuyuki Fujita was proposed but the NSAC turned it down due to competitive reasons—the fighters were at unequal experience/talent levels. After that a Wes Sims-Mark Hunt fight was turned down as well. The NSAC confirmed that Fujita would not be fighting anyone on the Pride 33 card as the deadline for receiving the medical records of fighters over the age of 35 (Fujita was 36) had passed (they must be submitted one week before the show so they can be properly reviewed and cleared).

Travis Wiuff's original opponent, Kazuhiro Nakamura, did not fight due to a knee injury.

Nick Diaz defeated Takanori Gomi in a non-title fight via Gogoplata. The victory was later ruled a No Contest due to a failed drug test (Cannabis) from Diaz.

The pay-per-view retailed for $34.99 and was announced by Lon McEachern, Frank Trigg, and Josh Barnett.

Results

References

See also 
 Pride FC
 List of Pride FC champions
 List of Pride FC events
 2007 in Pride FC

Pride Fighting Championships events
2007 in mixed martial arts
Mixed martial arts in Las Vegas
2007 in sports in Nevada